This is a list of diplomatic missions in the Democratic Republic of the Congo, also known as Congo-Kinshasa. There are currently 58 embassies in Kinshasa (not including honorary consulates).

Diplomatic missions in Kinshasa

Embassies

Other missions or delegations 
 (Delegation)

Consular missions

Goma 

 (Consulate)
 (Liaison office)
 (Liaison office)

Lubumbashi 

 (Consulate-General)
 (Consulate-General)
 (Consulate-General)
 (Consulate-General) 
 (Consulate-General)
 (Consulate)

Matadi 
 (Consulate-General)

Non-resident embassies accredited to Congo-Kinshasa 

Resident in Abuja, Nigeria:

Resident in Kampala, Uganda:

Resident in Luanda, Angola:

Resident in Nairobi, Kenya:

 
 

 

Resident in other cities:

 (Harare)
 (Lusaka)
 (New York City)
 (Paris)
 (Maputo)
 (Lusaka)
 (Dar es Salaam)
 (Pretoria)
 (Libreville)
 (Windhoek) 
 (Addis Ababa)
 (Pretoria)
 (Kigali)
 (Pretoria)
 (Brazzaville)

Closed missions

See also 
 Foreign relations of the Democratic Republic of the Congo
 List of diplomatic missions of the Democratic Republic of the Congo

References 

Congo, Democratic Republic of the
Diplomatic missions